Lomatium roneorum, Rone's desert-parsley or Rone's biscuit-root, is a species of Lomatium native to chalky soils in the Chumstick formation in Washington State. The specific epithet commemorates the surname Rone, as determined by an auction for the naming rights.

Description
Lomatium roneorum is approximately 40 cm tall when in flower or fruit and has numerous strongly overlapping blunt-tipped glabrous green to blue-gray leaflets born on thick stems and yellow flowers, distinguishing it from the nearby endemic Lomatium cuspidatum. Flowers are held above the foliage in a compound umbel on thick fleshy stalks that arise from the base of the plant.

References

roneorum
Plants described in 2018